Falsification of history in Azerbaijan is an evaluative definition, which, according to a number of authors, should characterize the historical research carried out in Azerbaijan with state support. The purpose of these studies, according to critics, is to exalt the Caucasian Albanians as the alleged ancestors of Azerbaijanis and to provide a historical basis for territorial disputes with Armenia. At the same time, the task is, firstly, to root Azerbaijanis in the territory of Azerbaijan, and secondly, to cleanse the latter of the Armenian heritage. In the sharpest and most detailed form, these accusations are presented by specialists from Armenia, but the same is said, for example, by Russian historians Victor Schnirelmann, Anatoly Yakobson, Vladimir Zakharov, Mikhail Meltyukhov and others, Iranian historian Hasan Javadi, American historians Philip L. Kohl and George Bournoutian.

According to the researcher Shireen Hunter, the distorted understanding by many Azerbaijanis of the true nature of cultural, ethnic and historical ties between Iran and Azerbaijan is associated with the legacy inherited by the modern Azerbaijan Republic from "the long Soviet practice of historic falsification" – to such historical myths she refers, in particular, the idea of the existence in ancient times of a unified Azerbaijani state, which included most of the territory of present-day northern Iran, which was divided into two parts as a result of the Russian-Iranian conspiracy.

The concept of "Albanian Khachdash" 

One of the most typical and widespread medieval Armenian monuments are khachkars - stone steles with a cross and carvings used as tombstones and objects of worship. Khachkars remained in large numbers on all lands where Armenians lived. Therefore, an important manifestation of the "Albanization" of the Armenian cultural heritage was the theory proclaiming the Armenian khachkars of Nagorno-Karabakh, Nakhichevan and (separating them) the Armenian Syunik as Albanian artifacts under the name "khachdashi" (with the replacement of the Armenian – car, "stone", with the Azeri – dash of the same meaning). According to the Azerbaijani architectural historian , khachdashi are distinguished by the fact that they bear in their decor signs of a fusion of Christianity with pre-Christian Albanian beliefs and contain symbols of Mithraism and Zoroastrianism.

In 1985, at the All-Union Archaeological Congress in Baku, Davud Aga-oglu Akhundov made a report in which he expressed these ideas, which provoked a scandal. The Armenian delegation announced its readiness to leave the conference, Leningrad scientists assessed Akhundov's report as a pseudoscientific political action. American archaeologist Philip L. Kohl believes that this report was a deliberate political provocation and aimed at creating a knowingly false cultural myth.

As Russian and Armenian critics later noted, Akhundov simply either did not know or deliberately ignored the well-known features of Christian iconography, declaring these subjects to be Mithraic, and also looked over the Armenian inscriptions on the "khachdash" he studied. According to the Russian specialist A. L. Yakobson, "Mithraist fog envelops almost all the monuments that the authors of <D. A. Akhundov with co-author M. D. Akhundov>, not to mention their generalizations". So, describing the Julfa khachkars of the 16th–17th centuries, Akhundov sees in the images of a lion, a bull and a bird "the eternal companions of God Mithra", while, according to experts, these are undoubted symbols of the Evangelists. The concept of "khachdash" was finally completed in Akhundov's book "Architecture of Ancient and Early Medieval Azerbaijan", reviewed by Academician Ziya Buniyatov, Doctor of Historical Sciences V.G. Aliyev and Doctor of Art History, Professor N.A Sarkisov.

This theory is now officially accepted in Azerbaijani science and propaganda. Thus, the chairman of the Azerbaijan Copyright Agency, Kamran Imanov, denounces the "Armenian tradition of appropriating our cultural values" as follows: These "scientists" at one time stole almost all the wonderful examples of our Christian past – memorials, churches, steles, tombstones, our khachdash, announced "Khachkars". According to the latest theories of Azerbaijani scholars, the custom of erecting stone khachdash crosses was brought to the Caucasus by the Turks back in the "pre-Albanian era".

Accusations in falsification

Accusations of source falsification 
According to the point of view prevailing in Azerbaijani historiography, the Armenians appeared in Transcaucasia only after 1828, when these territories were ceded to Russia. Nevertheless, there are a large number of Persian, Russian, Arab and other primary sources that record a significant presence of Armenians in the Transcaucasus and, especially, in the territory of Nagorno-Karabakh. According to George Burnutyan, the greatest irritation among Azerbaijani historians was caused by the fact that Muslim primary sources on Transcaucasia living in the territory of present-day Azerbaijan, such as Abbas Quli Bakikhanov, after whom the Institute of History of the Academy of Sciences of Azerbaijan is named, and Mirza Adigozal bey, also clearly note a strong Armenian presence in Karabakh before 1828. To neutralize this fact, Buniyatov and his colleagues, neglecting academic conscientiousness, began to republish medieval primary sources, in which information about the Armenians was deleted. George Burnutyan also gives similar examples of falsification by the Azerbaijani historian Nazim Akhundov in the 1989 reprint (according to Akhundov's statement) of Mirza Jamal Javanshir's book Tarikh-e Qarabagh (History of Karabakh), in places where the manuscript talks about the Armenian possessions of Karabakh the word "Armenian" is systematically omitted.

The distortion of the translation of Bakikhanov's book Gulistan i-Irem by Buniyatov was noted by historians Willem Floor and Hasan Javadi:
"This certainly is the case with Zia Bunyatov, who has made an incomplete and defective Russian translation of Bakikhanov's text. Not only has he not translated any of the poems in the text, but he does not even mention that he has not done so, while he does not translate certain other prose parts of the text without indicating this and why. This is in particular disturbing because he suppresses, for example, the mention of territory inhabited by Armenians, thus not only falsifying history, but also not respecting Bakikhanov's dictum that a historian should write without prejudice, whether religious, ethnic, political or otherwise." 
 — Willem Floor and Hasan Javadi. 

Victor Schnirelmann also notes that for Azerbaijani historians headed by Buniyatov, "the way to underestimate the presence of Armenians in the ancient and medieval Transcaucasia and diminish their role is to reissue ancient and medieval sources with cuts, replacing the term "Armenian state" with "Albanian state" or other distortions of the original texts", the fact of reprinting with cuts was also noted by the Russian orientalist Igor M. Diakonoff, the Armenian historian Muradyan and the American professor George Bournoutian.

Historians Mikhail Meltyukhov, Alla Ter-Sarkisiants and Georgy Trapeznikov note that in this publication, when translated from Farsi into Russian and Azerbaijani, "a lot of words and geographical terms ("Azerbaijan","Azerbaijani") appeared in the text, which, as anyone can understand historian, were absent in the Persian original". In the preface to the book Two chronicles on the history of Karabagh, a professor at the University of California, Barlow Ter-Murdechian, also notes Buniyatov's numerous distortions of the original texts of historians Mirza Jamal and Mirza Adigozal-Bek. According to George Burnutyan, such actions mean that without the publication of a facsimile copy of the original, Azerbaijani editions of sources related to Karabakh are unreliable: 
"There are still a number of Persian manuscripts on Karabakh in the archives of Azerbaijan which have yet to be examined critically. Some of this primary material has already appeared in edited Azeri translations and others will undoubtedly follow. Unfortunately, unless they include a certified facsimile of the original manuscript, the tententious scholarship demonstrated above will render all these translations highly suspect and unusable by scholars. // Such blatant tampering with primary source material strikes at the very heart of scholarly integrity. The international academic community must not allow such breaches of intellectual honesty to go unnoticed and uncensured." 
— George Bournoutian. 

Robert Hewsen in the Historical Atlas of Armenia, in a special note, warns of numerous distortions of the original texts of primary sources published in Soviet and post-Soviet Azerbaijan, the edition of which does not contain any mention of the Armenians present in the original work.

Sh. V. Smbatyan finds numerous distortions of sources in the work of Geyushev Christianity in Caucasian Albania. For example, the book by Hakob Manandian Feudalism in ancient Armenia is cited as Feudalism in ancient Albania by Geyushev, in the title of Suren Yeremian's article Moses Kalankatuisky on the embassy of the Albanian prince Varaz-Trdat to the Khazar Khakan Alp Ilitver the words of the Albanian prince Varaz-Trdat are given to Albania, the facts described with references to The History of the Country of Albania by Movses Kagankatvatsi are absent in this source. Armenian historian Hayk Demoyan, analyzing a photograph of a historical monument from the Historical Geography of Western Azerbaijan, comes to the conclusion that it was falsified from one of the three famous khachkars of the Goshavank monastery, created by the master Pogos in 1291. The Goshavank khachkar is considered one of the best examples of Armenian khachkar art of the 13th century.

Victor Schnirelmann also notes that inscriptions on khachkars are falsified in Azerbaijan. Philip L. Kohl, Mara Kozelski and Nachman Ben-Yehuda point to the falsification of the Mingachevir inscriptions by the Azerbaijani historian Mustafayev, who tried to read them in Azerbaijani (Turkic).

The Armenian historian P. Muradyan, analyzing the translation by Z. Buniyatov of the Armenian Anonymous Chronicle of the 18th century, reveals numerous distortions and "corrections" of the original text. For example, Buniyatov replaced the mentioned Armenian toponyms with Turkic ones, and in a number of places the academician completely deleted the word "Armenia" ("Ottoman troops attacked Armenia" became "the land where Armenians lived"). Muradyan and other historians note another example of falsification of a source by Buniyatov, in particular, the 15th century "Journey" by Johann Schiltberger.

Books of medieval sources were republished in Azerbaijan with the replacement of the term "Armenian state" with "Albanian state". Muradyan points to a similar distortion in the 1989 "Brief History of the Country of Aluank" by the Armenian historian Yesai Hasan-Jalalyan.

Accusations of distortion of quotations and references 

Historians A. A. Akopyan, P. M. Muradyan, and Karen Yuzbashyan in their work "On the Study of the History of Caucasian Albania" note that the Azerbaijani historian Farida Mammadova in the book "Political History and Historical Geography of Caucasian Albania" in confirmation of his the concept of the Armenian-Albanian border distorts the quotation of S.V. Yushkov, refers to books that do not contain such information (the authors find a similar reference in the work of Buniyatov). The authors also give an example where Mamedova, referring to Stephen of Syuni, distorts his message about the presence of several dialects, directly called by Stephen of Syuni Armenian dialects, presenting it as a message about the existence of various languages. The authors note that Mamedova criticizes the Armenian author of the late fifth century Pavstos Buzand for his tendentious attempt to prepare the population for the anti-Persian uprising that took place before Pavstos Buzand wrote the work. A. A. Akopyan, P. M. Muradyan, and K. N. Yuzbashyan summarize Mamedova's work as follows: 
"voluntarism in the study of antiquity, the falsification of the very concept of historicism, already the result of unhealthy tendencies, cannot be characterized otherwise than as an attempt to deceive one's own people, instill in them unworthy ideas, and tune in to wrong decisions." 

Doctor of Philology E. Pivazyan gives an example of falsification of F. Mamedova in her work "Political History and Historical Geography of Caucasian Albania", which on pages 24–25 attributed the translator's notes, which were absent in the original, to the author of the medieval code of law Mkhitar Gosh.

Historians K. A. Melik-Ogadzhanyan and S. T. Melik-Bakhshyan also give examples of distortion of quotations and references to nonexistent statements. A.V. Mushegyan discovers false references to authoritative authors by academician Z. Buniyatov.

Schnirelmann gives another example of distortion of links in the works of Mamedova and Buniyatov:
"Later, some Azerbaijani scholars began to completely reject the participation of Mesrop Mashtots in the creation of the Albanian writing system and tried to find an ally in this in the person of A.G. Perikhanyan (Mamedova, 1986, p. 7; Buniyatov, 1987c. P. 118). Meanwhile, in the work of Perikhanyan, only a hypothesis was expressed that Mesrop Mashtots attracted the Albanian Benjamin as his assistant, passing him the experience of creating writing. Perikhanyan clearly demonstrated that the Albanian alphabet was created under the unconditional influence of the Armenian one. Consequently, she did not in the least question the fact of Mesrop Mashtots' participation in his invention." (Perikhanyan, 1966, pp. 127–133). 

Leningrad historian D.I. n. A. Yakobson, criticizing the attempts of Azerbaijani historians to record the Gandzasar Monastery as a monument of Albanian (according to Yakobson, thus also Azerbaijani) architecture, also finds examples of distortion of quotations from the Azerbaijani historian Geyushev. Analyzing the report of D. A. and M. D. Akhundovs "Cult symbols and the picture of the world captured on the temples and steles of Caucasian Albania", Jacobson comes to the conclusion that the definitions given by the authors are "fake", and the report itself "distorts the artistic content and origin of the Armenian medieval decorative arts".

State support for history falsification 
V. A. Schnirelmann notes that there is a direct state order for publications with distortions of the source texts in Azerbaijan, designed to "clear" the history of Armenians:
"Another way to underestimate the presence of Armenians in ancient and medieval Transcaucasia and diminish their role is to republish ancient and medieval sources with cuts, replacing the term "Armenian state" with "Albanian state" or with other distortions of the original texts. In the 1960-1990s. Many such reprints of primary sources were published in Baku, which was actively pursued by Academician Z. M. Buniyatov. In the most recent years, describing ethnic processes and their role in the history of Azerbaijan, Azerbaijani authors sometimes generally avoid discussing the issue of the appearance of the Azerbaijani language and Azerbaijanis there, thereby making the reader understand that they have existed there from time immemorial.

It is unlikely that Azerbaijani historians did all this exclusively of their own free will; they were dominated by the order of the party and government structures of Azerbaijan."

According to George Bournoutian, propaganda "historical" books are published in Azerbaijan by order of the government, in which Azerbaijani historians try to prove that Armenians appeared in the Caucasus after 1828.

At the ceremonial meeting dedicated to the anniversary of the Nakhichevan Autonomous Republic (1999), the then President of Azerbaijan Heydar Aliyev directly called on historians to "create substantiated documents" and "prove that Azerbaijan belongs to the lands where Armenia is now located". Thus, according to Schnirelmann, the Azerbaijani authorities gave direct instructions to historians to rewrite the history of Transcaucasia. Farida Mammadova admits that Heydar Aliyev personally demanded from her scientific criticism of every book about the history of Albania published in Armenia.

The existence of the state program of falsification of the history of the Transcaucasus in Azerbaijan is also noted by the historians Mikhail Meltyukhov, Alla Ter-Sarkisiants and Georgi Trapeznikov.

Historian Vladimir Zakharov, deputy director of the MGIMO Center for Caucasian Studies, commenting on the words of Ilham Aliyev that Armenia was created on the primordial Azerbaijani lands, notes that "historical research in Azerbaijan is at the service not of science, but of the political ambitions of the leaders," and Azerbaijani historians are engaged in deceiving their own people.

On 14 December 2005, Ilham Aliyev, the President of Azerbaijan, in a speech on the occasion of the 60th anniversary of the Academy of Sciences of Azerbaijan, called on Azerbaijani scientists to get involved in the program of justifying the lack of historical rights of the Karabakh Armenians to Nagorno-Karabakh before the world community. President Aliyev promised to subsidize the program of uniting the efforts of Azerbaijani specialists in the development and propaganda of his thesis that "the Armenians came to Nagorno-Karabakh, an integral part of Azerbaijan, as guests," arguing that "in the 70s of the last century, a monument was erected there, reflecting their settlement, the 150th anniversary of the settlement of Armenians in Karabakh was celebrated" and therefore "the Armenians have absolutely no right to assert that Nagorno-Karabakh in the past belonged to them". On 26 April 2011, at the annual general meeting of the National Academy of Sciences of Azerbaijan, Ilham Aliyev repeated these theses and stated:
"Our scientists, responding positively to my call, in a short time have created excellent and based on real facts work related to the history of this region"

De Baets from Wesleyan University notes that historians are persecuted in Azerbaijan for "incorrect" interpretation of historical concepts. Thus, in December 1994, the historian Movsum Aliyev was arrested for publishing the article "Answer to the falsifiers of history."

Formation of the image of the "enemy" in Azerbaijan and Armenia 
Sergei Rumyantsev, candidate of sociological sciences, director of the Novator Center for Social Research, notes that the Karabakh war caused a complete break between Armenians and Azerbaijanis. In Azerbaijan, this led to the formation of an image of a victim, combined with revanchist aspirations. On the other hand, in Armenia, where genocide has become the main factor shaping identity, Azerbaijanis are promoted as de facto Turks. As an example, the researcher cites the construction of the image of a "historical enemy" on the basis of a literary work of the Turkic world of the 11th–12th centuries. "Kitabi Dede Gorgud", which is not only presented as a "historical chronicle of our fatherland", that is, Azerbaijan, aged thirteen centuries, but also the replacement of the Kipchak tribes (which served in the Turkic epic as an authentic image of the "infidels" with whom the Oguzes fought) by the Armenians and Georgians. As the author notes, "basically all the appeals to the text of the epic in the textbooks were intended to serve as the basis for the constructed image of the" historical enemy ". The events of recent years ... have led to the fact that this "honorable" place was taken first of all by the Armenians". Sergei Rumyantsev illustrates this with the example of a school textbook on Azerbaijani history (Ya. Mahmudlu, R. Khalilov, S. Agayev. Fatherland. Textbook for grade V. Third edition. Baku, 2003) Since the publication of textbooks is controlled by the state, we are talking, according to Rumyantsev, about the state political order, carried out by historians. According to independent experts in Armenia and Azerbaijan, this policy makes the differences more and more insurmountable every year. A generation of young people has grown up, for whom "Armenian" and "Azeri" have become an ideological cliché, an image of an "enemy".

Counter-accusations of Azerbaijani historians for distorting the facts of the history of Transcaucasia 
In turn, Azerbaijani politicians and scientists believe that it is the historians of other countries who invent the facts of the history of Transcaucasia. Thus, the Great Russian Encyclopedia was accused of distorting the facts. The Azerbaijani Embassy in Russia announced a note and demanded to withdraw the circulation of the encyclopedia. The Russian authorities did not react in any way to the note of the Azerbaijani authorities. Khazar Ibrahim, spokesman for the Ministry of Foreign Affairs of Azerbaijan, said:
"There are fictitious facts that do not correspond to history and offend the Azerbaijani people. First of all, we insist on the withdrawal of the circulation so that a negative image of the Azerbaijani public is not created, as well as for the Russian public, reading this book, to get an idea based on real facts, and not on the insinuations that took place in this circulation".

Director of the Institute of History of the National Academy of Sciences of Azerbaijan, Yagub Mahmudov, also believes that the historical presence of Armenians in the territory of Nagorno-Karabakh is "a strong distortion of history" and offers Russian historians assistance in presenting the "historical truth":
"I am familiar with this article, which was inserted into the 31st volume of the 62-volume Great Russian Encyclopedia. It greatly distorts the history of Nagorno-Karabakh, says that this is an ancient Armenian land, although on the basis of historical documents it is known that the resettlement of Armenians to Karabakh began in the 19th century, they were resettled from the Ottoman Empire and Iran. Other serious distortions have also been committed, one of which, for example, is the presentation of Nagorno-Karabakh as an independent state.
[...]
We can and are ready to help the Russian side provide historical data based on archival materials that will represent the historical truth".

Mahmudov also opposed the atlas "Turan on old maps" published jointly by Russian and Kazakh scientists. In the opinion of the director of the Institute of History of the Academy of Sciences of Azerbaijan, this publication is one of the results of the activities of Armenian nationalists, concerned about the huge successes of Azerbaijan in the international arena. Mahmudov characterizes this atlas as "an unthinkable anti-scientific, deliberate attack on Azerbaijan", in which there was no place for "the powerful states of Azerbaijan, which has a 5000-year history of statehood", while the map, according to Mahmudov, is fictional and is a falsification of Great Armenia, presented in the atlas many times.

Head of the Department of Karabakh History of the Institute of History of the National Academy of Sciences of Azerbaijan (ANAS), Doctor of Historical Sciences, Professor Gasim Hajiyev accuses Russians, Armenian and those Azerbaijani historians who "serving Armenians and Russians, also refuse to recognize the Turkic origin of Azerbaijanis of falsification of the ancient history of Transcaucasia." He noted that Turkic states existed on the territory of Azerbaijan even before the creation of the ancient states of Atropatena and Caucasian Albania. Speaking about 26 tribes, according to Strabo living in the territory of Caucasian Albania, Hajiyev notes that in the historical literature "the Turkic origin of such tribes as Saki, Gutii, Cimmerians, Gargars was completely denied. The Turkic origin of the Albanians themselves was also denied".

At the event on the topic "The problem of Nagorno-Karabakh – 20 years: The causes and results of defeats at the first stage", the former Minister of Education of Azerbaijan, Professor Firuddin Jalilov said:
"It is time to stop conducting a historical discussion with the Armenians at an amateurish level, and to involve specialists who know the history and characteristics of this people in the study of the Armenian problem. ... Immediately I note that you cannot call them Armenians, since they call themselves Khays, the Khay people, whose language is divided into Grabar (Balkan dialect) and Syrian. ... All the arguments that Armenia is an ancient country of Hays immediately become groundless and abstract, since there is no such nation as Armenians, there is a very ancient historical region of Armin in Asia Minor, where Turkic-speaking peoples lived ...
[...]
Our main problem and weakness, in my opinion, lies precisely in ignorance of these historical basics, confirmed by world science, but not advertised and hushed up everywhere due to the geopolitical interests of large countries. For the same political reasons, the Hays, who migrated and settled in the Arminu region in the Middle Ages, today also do not advertise their real self-name, although in their own language they continue to call themselves Hays, and the country Hayastan."

Azerbaijani architects D.A. and M.D. Akhundov believe that the accusations of the Russian historian and art critic D.I. n. Anatoly Yakobson is that their work on the Gandzasar Monastery (in which they argued that Gandzasar is an "Albanian" monastery, and the khachkars are in fact "Azerbaijani" cultural monuments) "distorts the semantic and artistic content and origin of Armenian medieval decorative art "Are incorrect, and in Jacobson's work" it is impossible to find at least one proposition that would correspond to historical reality. It is only unclear whether we are dealing with a deliberate falsification of history or the fruits of unprofessional creativity before us."

Senior Researcher of the Institute of Archeology and Ethnography of ANAS, Doctor of Historical Sciences Abbas Seyidov, commenting on the accusations against Azerbaijan regarding the destruction of khachkars in Julfa, claims that it is the Armenians themselves who are "total falsification of the history and culture of Azerbaijan", and in this they were helped in leadership USSR and "scientists like Piotrovsky" (M. Piotrovsky – Doctor of History, Director of the Hermitage; protested against the destruction of khachkars).

According to the director of the Institute of History of the Academy of Sciences of Azerbaijan Yagub Mahmudov, "Azerbaijani President Ilham Aliyev, who has deep and comprehensive historical knowledge," calls on "to go on the offensive in the information war against Armenian falsifiers". Mahmudov notes that the path outlined by Aliyev is the only one for "bringing historical reality to the attention of the world community."

Aydin Balayev in the book "Ethno-linguistic processes in Azerbaijan in the XIX-XX centuries" claims that the main falsifier of the history of Azerbaijan was the founder of the scientific school on the ancient history of Azerbaijan, director of the Institute of History named after A. A. Bakikhanov of the Azerbaijan Academy of Sciences Igrar Aliyev:
"The dubious fame of the founder of this "scientific" direction in national historiography rightfully belongs to Igrar Aliyev. For more than half a century, it was he who led the "crusade" against the national memory of Azerbaijanis. It should be admitted that during this period he single-handedly achieved much greater achievements in falsifying the ethno-linguistic history of Azerbaijanis than all anti-Azerbaijani centers abroad taken together. Suffering from a pathological form of turkophobia, I. Aliyev, starting from the 40s. XX century, in his numerous works with perseverance worthy of better application, he preached the "idea" according to which the leading role in the formation of the Azerbaijani people was played by the Iranian and Caucasian-speaking tribes and nationalities that inhabited the ancient Media and Atropatena, as well as Caucasian Albania."

Wikipedia is also accused of falsifying the historical facts of Azerbaijani history. Director of the Institute of Information Technologies of ANAS Rasim Alguliyev believes that "by placing distorted information on the pages of this encyclopedia in different languages, the enemies of the Islamic world are waging an information war."

On 7 December 2012, a meeting was held at the Presidium of ANAS, at which various information about the history of Azerbaijan was discussed, including publications in Wikipedia, which were regarded as falsification of the history of Azerbaijan. Solmaz Tovhidi, PhD, noted "the importance of creating a structure at the Institute of Cybernetics for the correct use and management of Wikipedia."

See also 
 Pseudohistory
 Anti-Armenian sentiment

Notes

References

Literature
 
 
 
 
 
 
 
 
 
 
 L. Melik-Shahnazaryan. Scam academy
 A. Shakhnazaryan. From the Sumerians to Turan – in search of the history of Azerbaijan
 Crombach, S. G. (2019). Ziia Buniiatov and the invention of an Azerbaijani past
 Notes from Lord Hylton, MA ARICS, resulting from a visit to Nagorno Karabakh and Armenia 13–21 April 1998

Historiography of Azerbaijan
Historical negationism